Garlinge is a village in the suburbs of Margate in Kent, United Kingdom, situated  southwest of the centre of the town. It is in the Thanet local government district.

Amenities
There is a small selection of shops in the village: newsagent/off-licence, two hairdressers, bakery/cafe, computer shop, pharmacy,  a petrol station (with ATMs and a retail outlet), a mini supermarket/post office and two car workshops. There is a fish and chip shop and an Indian and Chinese take away and an Indian restaurant/take-away. The village has two pubs - the Rodney on the High Street and the Hussar on Canterbury Road - the latter serves meals and has accommodation.

History
Garlinge takes its name from the former Garling's Farm, which was owned by the London hospitals Bridewell and Bethlem.

The Dent-de-Lion gateway is a grade II* listed building, dating from the late 14th/early 15th century (c1380).

Garlinge developed with the arrival of the railway to Margate and steam-packets bringing holiday makers from London. 

There was a Methodist Chapel in Garlinge by 1848. All Saints Church on Hartsdown Road, a Grade II listed building, was built in the early 1890s by Thomas Andrews of Margate, along with the former vicarage, also a listed building, designed by Edward Schroeder Prior.

Notable residents 

 Valentine Petit, gentleman, is recorded as living in Garlynge, in the parish of St John, Isle of Thanet, in 1460.  
 
 Charles James Fox owned the Dent-de-Lion Gateway ancient monument.

Demography 

At the 2001 UK census, the Garlinge electoral ward had a population of 4,858. The ethnicity was 98.8% white, 0.6% mixed race, 0.3% Asian, 0.1% black and 0.2% other. The place of birth of residents was 96.6% United Kingdom, 0.6% Republic of Ireland, 1.1% other Western European countries, and 1.7% elsewhere. Religion was recorded as 76.3% Christian, 0.2% Buddhist, 0% Hindu, 0.1% Sikh, 0.3% Jewish, and 0.1% Muslim. 13.8% were recorded as having no religion, 0.2% had an alternative religion and 9.1% did not state their religion.

The economic activity of residents aged 16–74 was 34.5% in full-time employment, 13.5% in part-time employment, 8.4% self-employed, 3.9% unemployed, 2.8% students with jobs, 3.6% students without jobs, 16.7% retired, 8.4% looking after home or family, 5.7% permanently sick or disabled and 2.6% economically inactive for other reasons. The industry of employment of residents was 15.9% retail, 13.7% manufacturing, 9.9% construction, 9.5% real estate, 14.3% health and social work, 9.3% education, 7.9% transport and communications, 4.7% public administration, 4.6% hotels and restaurants, 2.2% finance, 1.6% agriculture and 6.4% other. Compared with national figures, the ward had a relatively high proportion of workers in construction, education, and health and social work. There were a relatively low proportion in real estate and finance. Of the ward's residents aged 16–74, 9.3% had a higher education qualification or the equivalent, compared with 19.9% nationwide.

References

External links

Villages in Kent